The Valea Satului is a right tributary of the river Iza in Romania. It discharges into the Iza in Strâmtura.

References

Rivers of Romania
Rivers of Maramureș County